Kolakeia was a town in Malis in ancient Thessaly. It is mentioned by Theopompus. Its site has not been located.

References

Populated places in ancient Thessaly
Former populated places in Greece
Malis (region)
Lost ancient cities and towns